Tan Ying (born June 30, 1987 in Ningxia) is a female Chinese water polo player who was part of the national team at the 2006 World Cup. She will compete at the 2008 Summer Olympics.

See also
 China women's Olympic water polo team records and statistics
 List of women's Olympic water polo tournament goalkeepers

References
 profile

External links
 

1987 births
Living people
Sportspeople from Ningxia
Chinese female water polo players
Water polo goalkeepers
Olympic water polo players of China
Water polo players at the 2008 Summer Olympics
21st-century Chinese women